The Chinese poet Yao Shouzhong 姚守中 is thought to have been from the city of Luoyang 洛陽 in present Henan 河南. His dates are unclear. However, he seems to have been the nephew of the writer and official Yao Sui 姚燧 who lived from 1238 to 1313. Yao Shouzhong would then have lived in the early 14th century. Likewise, this Yao Sui was  himself the nephew of the celebrated official and scholar Yao Shu (1203–1280). The greater family had its origins in the Manchurian province of Liaoning and later moved to Luoyang. Yao Shouzhong appears to have been a local official functionary in Pingjiang in Hunan. The Lu Guibu 彔鬼簿 notes only that Yao was a literary talent from the previous generation. "The Ox’s Grievance" (Niu Suyuan) 牛訴冤 is the only surviving literary work of the writer, although titles of the three of his plays have survived. Tao’s Sanqu suite, "The Ox’s Grievance" (Niu Suyuan), is a classic of the genre and is one of the great imaginative poems in the genre of Chinese Sanqu poetry and Chinese literature as a whole. Although it has been suggested that "The Ox's Grievance" is a social satire, more likely it was intended as a literary burlesque or parody.

The Ox's Grievance

1.

By nature slow and stupid,

I lived in Misty Village doing farm work.

Ugly I was, but painters came to paint me.

In Apricot Village,

In Peach Glade Fields,

There were spring winds;

Beyond the scattered trees the sun went down.

I carried a flute playing boy home on my back.

2.

I loved spring plowing in the green fields,

A single plow by the rainy river.

Then I harrowed and was whipped along.

I suffered from my masters,

Suffered,

Suffered!

Through driving winds and beating rain,

Bitter cold and boiling heat.

From morning fog to evening mist.

3.

We oxen pasture near the river ford’s grassy bank,

Play and wander near the green-willowed shore

Of the red-waterweed lake.

Painters come to paint me for rural style paintings.

We work the fields alone or work in teams.

We have carried old sages into the mountains,

Helped generals in their battles;

There are ancient and modern tales and songs about us.

4.

Plowed mornings, plowed evenings, wasted my time.

Who was my hardship for?

One day I fell sick in the middle of the road.

I saw a high minister, and he questioned the farmers,

“Why is this old ox panting and wheezing?”

When he heard the story he sighed and sighed.

He admonished the farmers before he left,

Taking my name to the emperor.

5.

The emperor proclaimed that I enrich the state,

That I suffered a thousand, ten thousand hardships.

My kind at the waterways pull along ships.

At river crossings pull across carts.

By nature brave and strong,

Oxen are afraid of not even tigers!

In addition he said my keeper would be Wang Liu,

And I would assist at only festivals and ceremonies.

6.

The secretariat obeyed the emperor,

Affixed his seals and sent off the orders.

“All officials and constables

Will carry out the orders strictly and diligently.”

The law went down to the villages,

For the leaders of clans,

“Arrest anyone killing an ox.”

7.

Then the lovers of ox flesh grew no fatter,

Sellers of oxen grew no richer.

Of an ox grew old, He was not slaughtered, but left to die of old age.

Oxen were not work or plow.

The lower officials were instructed;

Reports were to be sent to the capital;

People should shun even dead oxen,

Leaving their bones unburied.

8.

Having grieved and suffered injustice;

For spring toil was completed.

I looked forward to living in leisure.

Then one day at the gate to the corral,

Two men came to look me over.

One was an ex-monk Xin from Nanzhuang,

And another was a butcher Wang from Beijiang.

How they made my heart beat faster!

If I am taken and sold, I thought,

My life would last only a second.

9.

My heart was fearful,

My whole being unsettled.

I could not bear them taking my blood

Even to anoint the sacrificial bell.

Why did they think a plowing ox best?

My keeper was a schemer and profit hungry;

They gave him money and took me away.

He didn’t even look as they led me down the road.

I sighed and I panted,

My eyes fearful with tears like pearls.

Murderers!

Murderers!

Their greedy natures were poisonous, wolfish.

They took and tied me to a butcher post.

10.

As they stared at me,

I only saw the knives in the hands.

I roared and stamped as my soul joined the shades.

My blood stained and covered the ground.

They cleaved the flesh from my bones,

The hide from my shoulders.

A sharp knife ripped and a thin blade sliced.

I was weighed on scales official and private.

The authorities just stood by the road and gawked.

What was left of me was put by the roadside for sale.

While Zhang Tanya took my loins,

Li Gungping wanted my chops.

11.

Having heard my screams, they still wanted to eat my flesh.

They cleared a space and boiled me in a cooker;

Cooked me until I was tasty and crisp.

They called in my old keeper,

He said for a thirty percent outlay he made a hundred percent profit.

Who thought to ask me, the one who lost his body forever?

Then there were those noble fellows who put on airs.

They wanted to eat and eat right there,

Then take some home to cook for their families.

12.

They wrapped me in meat pies for special guests,

Folded me in dumplings for invited friends.

Took me to the jar and slow cooked me with pepper and onions;

Better than dog meat for fighting the cold!

Superior to mutton for gaining strength.

You filled your belly bags full.

What about my life?

13.

I should have been the calf left to pasture;

But instead became the only bull in the field.

All for nothing my bitter battle of farming.

My keeper, just like all the other heartless and cruel.

I was a thing of monetary value!

With me fields and gardens are started.

Without me granaries are barren and bare.

14.

Clay oxen were made to pray for the spring;

Stone oxen were worshipped to bring the rain.

Now the earth-moving oxen are executed;

With whom will the deer roam the slopes?

The goats near the wheat fields have lost their friend.

This is what breaks the heart –

Never to see again the quarter moon through the willows,

Evening crows in the ancient trees.

15.

My sinews were made into bowstrings,

Hide stretched into drumheads.

My bones were sold to a jewelry maker,

Black horns made into ornaments for belts.

My hooves were fashioned into fancy combs;

Nothing was wasted, all was used.

My best hide was sold to a boot maker,

The scraps were sent back to my old keeper.

16.

I did not live out my years,

In death I was truly wronged!

I tell you Yama, Ruler of Shades,

I have no selfish motives;

Of bitterness in life,

I have suffered more than my share.

References 
Hu Qiaomu ed., The Great Encyclopedia  of China, Chinese Literature, vol. 2, Beijing-Shanghai, 1986, p. 1153.

Lu Weifen ed., Complete Yuan Period Sanqu Lyrics, Liaoning, 2000, vol. 1, pp. 325–332.

Ma Liangchun　and Li Futian ed., The Great Encyclopedia of Chinese Literature, Tianlu, 1991, vol. 6, p. 4620.

Carpenter, Bruce E. 'Chinese San-ch’ü Poetry of the Mongol Era: I', Tezukayama Daigaku kiyo (Journal of Tezukayama University), Nara, Japan, no. 22, pp. 47–51.

Yuan dynasty poets
14th-century writers
Writers from Luoyang
Poets from Henan